Daryna Prystupa (born 26 November 1987) is a Ukrainian athlete who competes in the sprint with a personal best time of 51.70 seconds at the 400 metres event.

Prystupa won the gold medal at the 2012 European Athletics Championships in Helsinki at the 4×400 metres relay. She has competed at the 20th European Athletics Championships.

External links
 

1987 births
Living people
Ukrainian female sprinters
Athletes (track and field) at the 2012 Summer Olympics
Olympic athletes of Ukraine
European Athletics Championships medalists